Thomas J. Samuelian is an American-Armenian linguist and author of a number of books and articles in the field of Armenian language, literature, and history. He is currently Dean of the College of Humanities & Social Sciences, American University of Armenia.

Samuelian has taught at the University of Pennsylvania, Columbia University and St. Nersess Seminary. He has a Ph.D. in linguistics from the University of Pennsylvania. He studied at Harvard Law School. He is Chairman of the Board of the Arak-29 Foundation.  He is the author of a Course in Modern Western Armenian, a translation/retelling of Yeznik of Kolb, a verse translation of the Armenian epic David of Sasun, and a complete translation of St.Gregory of Narek's Book of Lamentations.

Works 
 1989 - Course in Modern Western Armenian: Dictionary and Linguistic Notes, 
 1989 - A Course in Modern Western Armenian: Exercises and Commentary, 
 1993 - Armenian Dictionary in Transliteration: Western Pronunciation : Armenian-English English-Armenian

Translations 
 1999 - David of Sassoun (author Hovhannes Toumanian)
 2005 - The Armenian Prayer Book of St. Gregory of Narek, 
 Yeznik, Refutation of the Sects

References

External links
AUA College of Humanities & Social Sciences Biography
Arak-29 Foundation
Arlex International
The English translation of St. Gregory of Narek’s Book of Prayers: Speaking with God from the Depths of the Heart

American writers of Armenian descent
Armenian scientists
Harvard Law School alumni
University of Pennsylvania alumni
University of Pennsylvania faculty
Columbia University faculty
Academic staff of the American University of Armenia
Living people
Linguists from the United States
Year of birth missing (living people)